Richard Van Pham is a US citizen (originally from Vietnam) who survived three and a half months adrift in the Pacific Ocean from late May to September 2002.

Set adrift
62-year-old Pham set out from Long Beach, California on his 26-foot sail boat Sea Breeze (a Columbia 26 Mark I) heading for Catalina Island in late May 2002 - which should have taken about three hours. He lived on the boat in between fishing trips.

During the journey he claimed a sudden storm wrecked his mast and ruined his outboard motor. It later transpired he did not have a working VHF radio on board his boat. As he had no family, and had not filed a float plan, he was not reported missing.

Pham said he had survived on fish and birds and drinking rain water caught in a five-gallon bucket. He had caught turtles and used meat to trap sea birds such as cormorants. Using evaporated sea water he was able to preserve the meat he caught.

Pham's boat did have solar power installed which allowed him to watch videos on a small television.

Rescue
He was initially found by a US Customs P-3 Orion drug-hunting plane that alerted a US Navy frigate USS McClusky to Pham's position and he was rescued on 17 September 2002. His boat was then 480 km (300 miles) off Costa Rica and 4,000 km (2,500 miles) away from his starting point. Lieutenant of the US Navy said: "When we got to him, he was grilling a seagull on a grill that he had, the fuel that he was using to cook was the wood from his own boat". Pham's weight had dropped while adrift but a medical aboard the McClusky concluded Pham was in pretty good shape considering his almost four months at sea.

The US Navy sank his boat and the crew of the McClusky paid for Pham to fly from Guatemala (where he had been dropped off at Puerto Quetzal) to Los Angeles, arriving on 24 September 2002. He had on him his green card travel document issued in 1976.

Controversy
A number of sailing commentators have voiced concerns about the apparent length of Pham's period adrift. Pham insists he never saw a plane or another boat during his odyssey but given the busy nature of the California coast some people find this hard to believe as the area between Long Beach and Catalina Island is one of the busiest off the US coast.

References

External links
 http://articles.sfgate.com/2002-09-25/news/17561809_1_costa-rica-navy-officials-boat/2
 http://news.bbc.co.uk/2/hi/americas/2282532.stm
 http://www.cbp.gov/xp/CustomsToday/2002/December/other/rescue.xml

Shipwreck survivors
Vietnamese emigrants to the United States
Living people
Year of birth missing (living people)